Basarak (also Romanized as Başarak; also known as Basazak, Basrag, and Bastarak) is a village in Zarrineh Rud Rural District, Bizineh Rud District, Khodabandeh County, Zanjan Province, Iran. At the 2006 census, its population was 271, in 54 families.

References 

Populated places in Khodabandeh County